Davutköy can refer to:

 Davutköy, Daday
 Davutköy, Yenice